Canavan is a surname of Irish origin with two possible translations, both Anglicized:

1. "White Head" from O'Ceanndubhain Sept, who were hereditary physicians to the O'Flahertys of Connemara. Whitehead and Whitelock are sometimes used in Galway. Spelling variations include: Canovan, O'Canavan, Canaman, Kinevan, Kinavan, Kanavan, O'Kennevain.

2. "Black Head" from uiCeanndubhain – descendant of the dark haired one, a byname meaning ‘little black-headed one’, from ceann ‘head’ + dubh ‘black’ + the diminutive suffix -án.

People with the surname
 Brian Canavan, current CEO of the Australian National Rugby League team 
 Chris Canavan, British actor
 Paul Scott Canavan, Scottish artist and weird little guy
 Dennis Canavan, Scottish politician, Member of the Scottish Parliament for Falkirk West
 Ivor Canavan (1929–1999), politician in Northern Ireland
 Jim Canavan, baseball player in the American Association and National League, 1891 to 1897
 Katherine Canavan, United States diplomat and career foreign service officer
 Matt Canavan, Australian Federal MP
 Michael Noel Canavan, Irish police officer, recipient of the Scott Medal
 Myrtelle Canavan, American pathologist who described Canavan disease in 1931
 Niall Canavan, Irish footballer
 Pascal Canavan, Tyrone Gaelic footballer
 Pat Canavan, Dublin Gaelic football player
 Peter Canavan, Tyrone Gaelic footballer
 Peter P. Canavan, Irish police officer, recipient of the Scott Medal
 Trudi Canavan, Australian writer
 John A. Canavan (1896–1963), American attorney in Massachusetts

See also

References

External links
 Canavan Page at Ancestry.com

Surnames of Irish origin